Robert Ehrlich can refer to:

 Bob Ehrlich, American politician
 Robert Ehrlich (physicist), American physicist
 Robert Ehrlich (businessman), American entrepreneur
 Robert Ehrlich (musician), Northern Irish musician